I Want One of Those (also referred to as IWOOT) is an online retailer of gadgets, toys, clothing and homeware. It was acquired by THG plc from Findel Group in 2010.

History
The company was founded in January 2000 by Tim Booth, Angus Clacher and Mike Morrison with an initial investment of £15,000.

In October 2004, Kleeneze plc acquired IWOOT for £6.0 million in cash to be paid over
a three-year period plus performance related deferred consideration of up to
£4.65 million, payable over three years.

In August 2010, I Want One of Those and the wedding planning website Confetti were sold by Findel plc to The Hut Group for £600,000.

References

THG (company)
Online retailers of the United Kingdom
Companies based in Manchester
Retail companies established in 2000
British companies established in 2000
Retail companies of England